Paromita Vohra is an Indian filmmaker and writer. She is known for her documentaries on subjects such as urban life, pop culture and gender. She has also written the screenplay of the award-winning feature film Khamosh Pani.  Her film production company Parodevi Pictures is based in Mumbai. She writes a column Paro-normal Activity for the Sunday Mid-day and also wrote a weekly column for Mumbai Mirror.

Biography 
Vohra lives in Mumbai. She is the daughter of Shikha Vohra, who in turn was the daughter of the music composer Anil Biswas by his first wife Ashalata Biswas, an actress who worked in Hindi cinema during the 1930s and 1940. Vohra studied mass communication in Miranda House at the University of Delhi (1986 – 1989).

Vohra co-founded Agents of Ishq, an online platform for positively representing sex in India through various media forms.  She is also its current creative director. Agents of Ishq has multimedia content in English and Hindi and helps readers access comprehensive sexuality education, focusing on the three aspects of sex education, sexual experience and sexual etiquette. Vohra has indicated that the platform should talk about "desire, freedom, gender, equality, and choice". and a place where young Indians can access the right information about sex.

With Ram Devineni, Vohra co-wrote Priya's Mirror, the second chapter to Priya's Shakti, a 2016 augmented reality infused comic that focuses on acid attacks and violence against women.

Vohra created sound installations for Project Cinema City, a 2012 exhibition on cinema, the city, and archiving contemporary culture, So Near Yet So Far,  which travelled to the National Gallery of Modern Art, Delhi, Mumbai and Bangalore. She has acted as ‘Aunty 303’ in the Channel V promos of the same name. She had a cameo in the film English, August.

Work

Filmography

Filmography

References

External links 
And I make Documentaries (April 2, 2015 Interview)
Films work by form (March 19, 2017 Interview)
Each Journey Is Different And Valid, As Long As There Is Consent: Paromita Vohra (July 12, 2018 Interview)
Interview: Paromita Vohra - TARSHI (August 1, 2018 Interview)

Film directors from Mumbai
Indian women columnists
Indian documentary filmmakers
Delhi University alumni
Living people
Women artists from Maharashtra
21st-century Indian film directors
21st-century Indian women artists
Indian women documentary filmmakers
Year of birth missing (living people)
Indian feminists